Brian M. Greene is an American politician and a Republican member of the Utah House of Representatives representing District 57 from January 1, 2013 to December 31, 2018.

Early life and career
Greene earned his BA from Brigham Young University and his JD from its J. Reuben Clark Law School. He works as an attorney and small business owner and lives in Pleasant Grove, Utah with his wife Renee and three children.

Political career
When District 57 incumbent Republican Representative Craig Frank ran for the Utah State Senate in 2012 and left the seat open, Greene was selected as one of two candidates from the Republican convention for the June Republican Primary which he won with 2,057 votes (55.4%) and won the November General election with 11,029 votes (85.8%) against Democratic nominee Scott Gygi.

In 2014, Greene defeated both John Stevens and Holly Richardson in the Republican convention and then continued on to defeat Democratic nominee Michael Plowman in the November 4, 2014 general election with 6,317 votes (82.5%).

In 2015, Greene questioned whether sex with an unconscious spouse should be considered rape during a committee hearing on a measure which sought to clarify that sex with an unconscious individual is rape. Greene later apologized for his comments and said media reports had taken his words out of context.

During the 2016 legislative session, Greene served on the Natural Resources, Agriculture, and Environmental Quality Appropriations Subcommittee, the House Judiciary Committee as well as the House Revenue and Taxation Committee.

2016 sponsored legislation

Representative Greene also floor sponsored SB0090S04 Falsification of Information in a Protective Order Proceeding.

References

External links
Official page at the Utah State Legislature
Campaign site
Brian Greene at Ballotpedia
Brian M. Greene at the National Institute on Money in State Politics

Place of birth missing (living people)
Year of birth missing (living people)
Living people
Brigham Young University alumni
J. Reuben Clark Law School alumni
Republican Party members of the Utah House of Representatives
People from Pleasant Grove, Utah
Utah lawyers
21st-century American politicians